Anuradha Neelendra Dullewe Wijeyeratne  (Sinhala: අනුරාධ නිලේන්ද්‍ර දූල්ලෑව විජයරත්න) (born 22 March 1962) (known as  Anuradha Dullewe Wijeyeratne) is a Sri Lankan politician and entrepreneur,  He has served as the acting Diyawadana Nilame (Chief lay Custodian) of the Sri Dalada Maligawa, Kandy on several occasions for three decades appointed by the Commissioner General of Buddhist Affairs with recommendation from Mahanayaka Theras of the Malwatte and Asgiriya Chapters of Siam Nikaya. He was a Provincial Councillor of the Sabaragamuwa Provincial Council too. In March 2020, he was invited by the United National Party to contest the Parliamentary General Election 2020 and was appointed as the chief organizer for the Mawanella electorate. In 2020 general elections, Wijeyeratne ran unsuccessfully for the Kegalle District seat in Parliament. He is ideologically positioned on the right wing of the United National Party.

Early life

He was born on 22 March 1962 in Anuradhapura to a prominent political family who had been in active politics in the country for nine decades since 1931. Anuradha is the third son of Nissanka Wijeyeratne and Nita Wijeyeratne (née Dullewe) and has three brothers and a sister. They are Neranjan, Mano, Lankesh and Nishangani. His father Nissanka and grandfather, Sir Edwin Wijeyeratne were prominent politicians who had become cabinet ministers. Wijeyeratne was educated at Royal College, Colombo, before moving to Kingswood College, Kandy and later D. S. Senanayake College, Colombo.

Political career
Wijeyeratne entered active politics in 1984 from United National Party's Samavadhi Student Union and also served as member of the United National Party National Executive Committee.  Later he contested the Provincial Council elections in 1988 and was elected to the Sabaragamuwa Provincial Council. He had also served as the Public Relations Officer, Ministry of Higher Education & coordinating secretary to the Ministry of Justice. He was a member of Sri Lanka Government Delegation to the UNESCO 1979 Regional Conference in Geneva, Switzerland, member of the Sri Lankan Government Delegation in 1983 for the Commonwealth Sri Lanka festival held in London, member of the Government Delegation for the 1983 International Peace Conference, Hiroshima, Japan, a member of the Sri Lanka Government Delegation to UNESCO 1985 General Conference in Sofia, member of Sri Lanka Government Delegation to UNESCO 1987 General Conference in Paris, France and member of Sri Lanka Government Delegation to 1993 Asia Local government Conference in Kyoto, Japan. Wijeyeratne had also served as the Chairman of Dedigama Electorate Development Planning Committee.

Family
 
He is married to Dayanganie, daughter of Tudor Gunasekara (former minister and diplomat) and Chandra Gunasekara (née Perera). Anuradha and Dayanganie have one daughter, Dr Yanushi Dullewe Wijeyeratne, Cardiology Specialty Registrar with PhD at St George's University Hospitals NHS Foundation Trust, London, UK.

See also
Diyawadana Nilame, Sri Dalada Maligawa, Kandy
List of political families in Sri Lanka

References

External links
  The Wijeyeratne Ancestry
  The Ratwatte Ancestry

1962 births
Living people
Sri Lankan Buddhists
Anuradha Dullewe
People from Colombo
Alumni of Royal College, Colombo
Alumni of Kingswood College, Kandy
Alumni of D. S. Senanayake College
Sinhalese businesspeople
Sinhalese politicians
United National Party politicians
Members of the Sabaragamuwa Provincial Council
Provincial councillors of Sri Lanka